The Achaemenid inscription in the Kharg Island is an important inscription from the Achaemenid Empire that was discovered in 2007 while constructing a road. It is located on Kharg Island, Iran. This inscription is written in Old Persian language with Old Persian cuneiform alphabet. The height and the width of this inscription is around one meter. The inscription was etched around 400 BC. The inscription contains five lines and six Old Persian words, five of which were unknown at the time it was discovered. The inscription reads as “The not irrigated land was happy [with] my bringing out [of water]”. The linguist Habib Borjian explains that if the inscription is authentic, combined with the island's known history of kariz usage, "which came about under the Achaemenid rule in the Near East (550–330 BCE)", it can be suggested that there was a Persian colonisation of Kharg under the Achaemenids. The Iranian dialect of the Persian settlers of the Achaemenid period may have in turn been the ancestor of the Khargi language, with Borjian adding that "there is no contradicting evidence to make this hypothesis implausible". Some Arab states of the Persian Gulf have unsuccessfully tried to show that the inscription is forged. In 2008, the inscription was severely vandalized and now 70 percent of the text is destroyed and only one line of inscription survived. Kharg island is an important island belonging to Iran and a license is needed for travel to the island. The Cultural Heritage, Handcrafts and Tourism Organization of Iran said that "This inscription is an evidence to the name of Persian Gulf".

References

External links 
 سنگ‌نبشته خارک: گزارش مقدماتی از خوانش کتیبه نویافته در جزیره خارک

4th-century BC inscriptions
2007 archaeological discoveries
2007 in Iran
Archaeology of the Achaemenid Empire
Achaemenid inscriptions
History of the Persian Gulf
Kharg
Archaeological discoveries in Iran
Bushehr County